A standard data model  or industry standard data model (ISDM) is a data model that is widely applied in some industry, and shared amongst competitors to some degree.  They are often defined by standards bodies, database vendors or operating system vendors.  

When in use, they enable easier and faster information sharing because heterogeneous organizations have a standard vocabulary and pre-negotiated semantics, format, and quality standards for exchanged data.  The standardization affects software architecture as solutions that vary from the standard may cause data sharing issues and problems if data is out of compliance with the standard.

The more effective standard models have developed in the banking, insurance, pharmaceutical and automotive industries, to reflect the stringent standards applied to customer information gathering, customer privacy, consumer safety, or just in time manufacturing.

Typically these use the popular relational model of database management, but some use the hierarchical model, especially those used in manufacturing or mandated by governments, e.g., the DIN codes specified by Germany. While the format of the standard may have implementation trade-offs, the underlying goal of these standards is to make sharing of data easier.

The most complex data models known are in military use, and consortia such as NATO tend to require strict standards of their members' equipment and supply databases.  However, they typically do not share these with non-NATO competitors, and so calling these 'standard' in the same sense as commercial software is probably not very appropriate.

Example Standard Data Models 

 ISO 10303 CAE Data Exchange Standard - includes its own data modelling language, EXPRESS
 ISO 15926 Process Plants including Oil and Gas facilities Life-Cycle data
 IDEAS Group Foundation Ontology agreed by defence departments of Australia, Canada, France, Sweden, UK and USA
  EN12896 CEN Reference Data Model For Public Transport. covering public transport scheduling, fare management,  operations and passenger information 
 Common Education Data Standards (CEDS) is a data dictionary standard model sponsored by the U.S. government that is used widely in the United States education system
 SIF is an interoperability specification used as a standard data model in Australia, the UK, and the US.

References

External links 
 Professional Petroleum Data Management Association Lite Data Model
Energistics Energy Standards Resource Center
Pipeline Open Data Standard
Ed-Fi Data Standard

Data modeling